Shami kabab or shaami kabab is a local variety of kebab, originating from the Indian subcontinent. It a popular dish in modern-day Indian, Pakistani and Bangladeshi cuisines. It is composed of a small patty of minced meat, generally beef, but occasionally lamb or mutton (a chicken version exists as well), with ground chickpeas, egg to hold it together, and spices. Shami kebab is eaten as a snack or an appetizer, and is served to guests especially in the regions of Dhaka, Deccan, Punjab, Kashmir, Uttar Pradesh and Sindh.

They are often garnished with lemon juice and served with sliced raw onions as a side salad, and may be eaten with chutney made from mint or coriander. They are also served along with sheer khurma during the celebrations of the Islamic festival of Eid.

Preparation
Shami kababs are boiled or sauteed meat (beef or lamb) and chickpeas (chana daal) with whole hot spices (garam masala, black pepper, cinnamon, cloves, bay leaves), whole ginger, whole garlic and some salt to taste until completely tender. Onions, turmeric, chili powder, egg, chopped green coriander, chopped green chillies and chopped mint leaves may be added in preparing kebab. Garam masala powder (ground spices) may be used in place of whole hot spices.

The cooked meat is then ground in such a way that it is fibrous and does not become a paste. It is then shaped into diamond or round patties and is shallow fried.

With a rise in vegetarianism and veganism, various new methods and recipes of making shami kabab have emerged in the subcontinent.

Serving
Shami kebabs may be served with roti along with ketchup, hot sauce, Schezwan sauce, chilli garlic sauce, raita or chutney. Before serving the kebabs, it is also common to dip them in a beaten egg mixture and double fry them. They are also commonly eaten in Hyderabad with cooked rice or chapati.

Etymology
There are several etymological explanations behind the shami kebab. One explanation is that the name of the dish derives from the word shaam, which means "dinner" and "night" in Persian. It also means evening in Urdu and Hindi. The name may also derive from the scent of an itr called shamama. The name shami kebab may also refer to Bilad al-Sham, the modern Syria, as many cooks from that region migrated to the wealthy Mughal Empire of South Asia during the Middle Ages.

See also 

 Hyderabadi cuisine
 Punjabi cuisine
 Sindhi cuisine
 Indian cuisine
 List of kebabs
 Pakistani cuisine
 Pakistani meat dishes
 Bangladeshi cuisine
 Bengali cuisine
 Frikadeller

References

Kebabs
Indian cuisine
Punjabi cuisine
Bangladeshi cuisine
Bengali cuisine
Hyderabadi cuisine
Indian meat dishes
Indian fast food
Kashmiri cuisine
Mughlai cuisine
Pakistani meat dishes
Pakistani fast food
Sindhi cuisine
Uttar Pradeshi cuisine
Appetizers
Food watchlist articles